Rotberget is a village in Grue Municipality in Innlandet county, Norway.

History
Starting on 1 January 1838, Rotberget was administratively a part of the municipality of Hof. On 1 January 1963, Hof became a part of Åsnes municipality, and then on 1 January 1969 Rotberget was moved to the neighboring municipality Grue. At that time Rotberget had twenty three inhabitants.

References

Grue, Norway
Villages in Innlandet